Holos. Dity (Ukrainian: Голос. Дiти; meaning The Voice Kids)  is a Ukrainian music talent show for children from 6 to 14 years, based on the concept of the show Голос країни. The first broadcast took place on the 1+1 network on November 4, 2012. The show’s fifth season premiered in May 2019 and concluded two months later.

Coaches and presenters

Coaches

Presenters

Coaches and finalists
 – Winning coach & contestant. 
 – Runner-up coach & contestant.
 – Third place coach & contestant.

 Winners are in bold, remaining finalists in italic, and eliminated contestants in small font.

Series overview
Warning: the following table presents a significant amount of different colors.

Gallery 

1+1 (TV channel) original programming
Ukrainian reality television series
2012 Ukrainian television series debuts
Television series about children
Television series about teenagers